Conclusions is the first studio album from Altars. Facedown Records released the album on June 5, 2012. Altars worked with Seth Munson in the production of this album.

Critical reception

Awarding the album three stars from HM Magazine, David Stagg states, "Conclusions grew on me." Christian Cunningham, rating the album a six out of ten for Cross Rhythms, writes, "'Conclusions' descends into decidedly average riffing." Giving the album three and a half stars at Jesus Freak Hideout, Michael Weaver says, "At times they shine and at others the sound isn't much more than generic hardcore." Brody Barbour, indicating in a three star review by Indie Vision Music, describes, "Conclusions is nothing extremely out of the norm". Signaling in a two and a half star review by The New Review, Max Grundström states, "Song quality rapidly declines the closer you get to the end of Conclusions".

Track listing

References

2012 debut albums
Altars (American metal band) albums
Facedown Records albums